Route 172 is a minor Connecticut state highway running entirely within the town of Southbury. The road serves the village of South Britain.

Route description
Route 172 begins at an interchange with I-84/US 6 (at Exit 14) in western Southbury. It officially begins at the eastbound off-ramp at exit 14 of I-84, where it also intersects Main Street South, the surface route to Southbury center. Route 172 proceeds northward, following a C-curve route, crossing the Pomperaug River into the village of South Britain in the western part of Southbury about a mile later. The road continues north for another three miles (5 km) before ending at an intersection with Route 67 in northern Southbury. The entire route is known as South Britain Road and is classified as a collector road. It carries average volumes of 7,000 vehicles per day.

History
Route 172 was created as part of the 1932 state highway renumbering from a previously unnumbered road. It was extended to an interchange with I-84 in 1963.

Junction list

References

External links

172
Transportation in New Haven County, Connecticut